Avelar Brandão Vilela (June 13, 1912 – December 19, 1986) was a Brazilian Cardinal of the Roman Catholic Church. He served as Archbishop of São Salvador da Bahia from 1971 until his death, and was elevated to the cardinalate in 1973.

Biography
Avelar Brandão Vilela was born in Viçosa, and studied at the seminaries in Maceió and in Olinda. He was ordained to the priesthood on October 27, 1935. He then served as a professor and spiritual advisor of the seminary of Aracajú, secretary of the Diocese of Aracajú, and diocesan chaplain of the Catholic Action.

On June 13, 1946, his thirty-fourth birthday, Vilela was appointed Bishop of Petrolina by Pope Pius XII. He received his episcopal consecration on the following October 27 from Bishop José Gomes da Silva, with Bishop Adalberto Accioli Sobral and Archbishop Mário de Miranda Villas-Boas serving as co-consecrators. Vilela was later promoted to Archbishop of Teresina on November 5, 1955, and attended the Second Vatican Council from 1962 to 1965. Serving as President of the Latin American Episcopal Conference from 1966 to 1972, he was named Archbishop of São Salvador da Bahia on March 25, 1971.

Pope Paul VI created him Cardinal Priest of Santi Bonifacio e Alessio in the consistory of March 5, 1973. Vilela was one of the cardinal electors who participated in the conclaves of August and October 1978, which selected Popes John Paul I and John Paul II respectively. He earned the nickname of the "Great Conciliator" for his ability to reach both progressives and conservatives in the Brazilian Church, and was given the title of Primate of Brazil when his archdiocese was raised to that rank on October 25, 1980.

The Cardinal died from stomach cancer in São Salvador, at age 74. He is buried at the metropolitan cathedral of São Salvador da Bahia.

References

Trivia
The Cardinal was the brother of Senator Teotonio Vilela (d. 1983)

External links
Cardinals of the Holy Roman Church
Catholic-Hierarchy

1912 births
1986 deaths
Brazilian cardinals
20th-century Roman Catholic archbishops in Brazil
20th-century venerated Christians
Participants in the Second Vatican Council
Deaths from stomach cancer
Cardinals created by Pope Paul VI
Deaths from cancer in Brazil
Roman Catholic archbishops of Teresina
Roman Catholic archbishops of São Salvador da Bahia
Roman Catholic bishops of Petrolina